Paul Brodeur (born May 16, 1931) is an American investigative science writer and author, whose writings have appeared in The New Yorker, where he began as a staff writer in 1958. He lives on Cape Cod. For nearly two decades he researched and wrote about the health hazards of asbestos. He has also written about the dangers of household detergents, the depletion of the ozone layer, microwave radiation and electromagnetic fields from power lines.

In 1992 he donated 300 boxes of papers accumulated during his research to the New York Public Library. In 2010 he was informed that the NYPL had finished culling the papers it chose to retain in its collection. Brodeur publicly objected, stating that the materials to be removed were essential to understanding his investigative process. Brodeur's papers are now archived at the Howard Gotlieb Archival Research Center at Boston University.

Science writer Gary Taubes has said Brodeur's writings on electromagnetic radiation are part of what inspired him to switch from writing about bad practices in physics to epidemiology and public health.

Brodeur's short stories have appeared in The New Yorker, The Saturday Evening Post, and Show Magazine. His 1970 novel The Stunt Man inspired the Academy-Award nominated 1980 film of the same name, starring Peter O'Toole as an egotistical movie director.

Brodeur graduated from Phillips Academy and Harvard College.

His daughter, Adrienne Brodeur, is an author and program director at the Aspen Institute.

Bibliography
 The Sick Fox (novel) – 1963
 The Stunt Man (novel) – 1970
 Downstream (short stories) – 1972
 "Asbestos & Enzymes" – 1972
 "Expendable Americans" – 1974
 "The Zapping of America: Microwaves, Their Deadly Risk, and the Coverup" – 1977
 "The Asbestos Hazard" – 1980
 "Outrageous Misconduct: the Asbestos Industry on Trial" – 1985
 "Restitution: The Land Claims of the Mashpee, Passamaquoddy, and Penobscot Indians of New England" – 1985
 "Currents of Death" – 1989
 "The Great Power-Line Cover-Up: How the Utilities and Government Are Trying to Hide the Cancer Hazard Posed by Electromagnetic Fields" – 1993
 "Secrets: A Writer in the Cold War" – 1997

References

External links 
 
 Paul Brodeur: A Breach of Trust at The New York Public Library
 The Case of Paul Brodeur vs the NYPL|Felix Salmon
 Bloggingheads.tv – Science Saturday: Why We Get Fat

Writers from Boston
The New Yorker staff writers
American science writers
1931 births
Living people
20th-century American novelists
20th-century American male writers
American male novelists
21st-century American politicians
Novelists from Massachusetts
20th-century American non-fiction writers
American male non-fiction writers
Phillips Academy alumni
Harvard College alumni